Paul Grohmann (12 June 1838 – 29 July 1908) was an Austrian mountaineer and writer.

Biography
Grohmann was a pioneer in exploring technically challenging mountains and is thought to have made more first ascents of Eastern Alps summits than anyone else. Among these are the four highest summits in the Dolomites. In 1862, Grohman, Friedrich Simony and Edmund von Mojsvár founded the Austrian Alpine Club. This was the second mountaineering club in the world, following the founding of the British Alpine Club in 1857.

In 1875, he published a detailed map of the Dolomites (Karte der Dolomit-Alpen) and, in 1877, the travel book Wanderungen in den Dolomiten, which significantly stimulated mountain tourism in the area.

In his honor, the as yet unclimbed Sasso di Levante in the Langkofel Dolomites was renamed Grohmannspitze in 1875. The west peak of the Kellerspitzen in the Carnic Alps, which he first-ascended in 1868, is also known as Grohmannspitze.  Already in 1898, 10 years before his death, the town of Urtijëi erected a monument to honor his many first ascents in the Dolomites. Since 1984 there is a Grohmann street in Vienna's Donaustadt district.

First ascents 

Among the many peaks he and his guides were the first to ascend are:
 Hochalmspitze in the Hohe Tauern (15 August 1859) with guides "Lenzbauer" and Franz Moidele
 Tofana di Mezzo in the Dolomites (29 August 1863), with the guide :it:Francesco Lacedelli
 Antelao (Dolomites) (18 September 1863) with guides Francesco and Alessandro Lacedelli and Matteo Ossi 
 Boespitze (Dolomites) (30 July 1864) with G. Irschara (though previously climbed by hunters)
 Tofana di Rozes (Dolomites) (29 August 1864) with Francesco Lacedelli, :it:Angelo Dimai and Santo Siorpaes
 Sorapiss (Dolomites) (16 September 1864) with Francesco Lacedelli and Angelo Dimai
 Marmolada (Dolomites) (28 September 1864) with guides Angelo and Fulgentio Dimai
 Hochfeiler (Zillertal Alps) (24 Juli 1865) with the guides Josele Samer and Peter Fuchs
 Monte Cristallo (Dolomites) (14 September 1865), with guides Santo Siorpaes and Angelo Dimai
 Hohe Warte  (Carnic Alps) (30 September 1865) with Nicolò Sottocorona and "the farmer Hofer"
 Olperer (Zillertal Alps) (10 September 1867) with guides Josele Samer and Gainer Jackele
 Kellerwand (Carnic Alps) (14 July 1868) with Josef Moser and Peter Salcher
 Dreischusterspitze (Dolomites) (18 July 1869) with guides Peter Salcher and :de:Franz Innerkofler
 Langkofel (Dolomites) (13 August 1869) with guides Peter Salcher and Franz Innerkofler
 Große Zinne (Dolomites) (21 August 1869), with guides Franz Innerkofler and Peter Salcher

References

External links 
 Grohmanns monument in Urtijëi, publications (checked on October, 2 2010) 

1838 births
1908 deaths
Austrian mountain climbers
Austrian male writers
Sportspeople from Vienna